Matt Johnson (born 1978) is an artist based in Los Angeles,

Johnson was born in New York City.  He is a sculptor who creates humorous works out of everyday materials.  His art has been compared to that of Tom Friedman and Charles Ray for its innovative manipulation of objects. His first solo show was in New York City in 2004, less than a year after receiving his Masters of Fine Arts degree from University of California, Los Angeles.

Selected solo exhibitions 
2017   

Wood Sculpture, 303 Gallery, New York, NY

2015   'Matt Johnson: Lautner Beams, Pacific Design Center, West Hollywood, CA2014   Blum & Poe, Los Angeles, CA2013   Alison Jacques Gallery, London, UK2012   303 Gallery, New York, NY2011   Blum & Poe, Los Angeles, CA2010   Alison Jacques Gallery, London, UK2009   Matt Johnson: Super System, Taxter & Spengemann, New York, NY2006  Blum & Poe, Los Angeles, CA2005   Taxter & Spengemann, New York, NY2004   Taxter & Spengemann, New York, NY

 Selected group exhibitions 2017alt-facts, Postmasters Gallery, New York, NY

Jump Ball, Dio Haria, Mykonos, Greece

99 Cents or Less, Museum of Contemporary Art Detroit, Detroit, MI

Concrete Island, Venus Over Los Angeles, Los Angeles, CA2016Phoenix Rising: The Valley Collects, Phoenix Art Museum, Phoenix, AZ

6’s and 7’s, Outdoor Sculpture at Marlborough Gallery Breezeway, New York, NY

Wanderlust, The Highline, New York, NY2015love or the lack of it, curated by Friedrich Kunath, Travesia Cuatro, Madrid, Spain

Small Sculpture, Shane Campbell Gallery, Chicago, IL2014Frieze Sculpture Park, London, UK

Broadway Morey Boogie, Broadway Malls, New York, NY, presented by Marlborough Chelsea, New York, NY2013The Perfect Show, 303 Gallery, New York, NY

Eagles, Marlborough Gallery, Madrid, Spain

Funny, FLAG Art Foundation, New York, NY

Lifelike, Walker Museum of Art, Minneapolis, MN; traveling to New Orleans Museum of Art, LA; Museum of Contemporary Art, San Diego, CA; Blanton Museum of Art, University of Texas at Austin, TX

Blind Cut, Marlborough Chelsea, New York, NY

Object Fictions, James Cohan Gallery, New York, NY2012Levitating Woman, 2012, Ekebergparken Sculpture Park, Oslo

303 Gallery, New York, NY

The Perfect Show, 303 Gallery, New York, NY

Eagles, Marlborough Gallery, Madrid, Spain

Lifelike, Walker Museum of Art, Minneapolis, MN; traveling to New Orleans Museum of Art, LA

Blind Cut, Marlborough Chelsea, New York, NY

Object Fictions, James Cohan Gallery, New York, NY2011Burning, Bright: A Short History of the Light Bulb, Pace Gallery, New York, NY

Greater LA, 2nd Floor of 483 Broadway, New York, NY201011th Triennale fur Kleinplastik, Fellbach, Germany (exh. cat.)2009Abstract America, Saatchi Gallery, London, UK

Second Nature: The Valentine-Adelson Collection, UCLA Hammer Museum, Los Angeles, CA

15th Anniversary Inaugural Exhibition, Blum & Poe, Los Angeles, CA

Born in the Morning, Dead by Night, Leo Koenig, New York, NY2008PM Dawn, Taxter & Spengemann, New York, NY

Shape of Things to Come: New Sculpture, Saatchi Gallery, London, UK

The Form Itself, Priska C. Juschka Fine Art, New York, NY2007Making Do, Yale University School of Art Gallery, New Haven CT

All About Laughter: Humor in Contemporary Art, Mori Art Museum, Tokyo (exh. cat.)

Makers and Modelers, Gladstone Gallery, New York, NY

Objects, Karma International, Zurich, Switzerland

Sculptors’ Drawings: Ideas, Studies, Sketches, Proposals, and More, Angles Gallery, Santa Monica, CA

Time Difference, The Frank Cohen Collection, Initial Access Gallery, Wolverhampton, UK2006The World is Round, Public Art Fund, MetroTech Center, Brooklyn, NY (exh. cat.)

Clarissa Dalrymple’s Exhibition of Young Artists to Benefit the Foundation for Contemporary Arts, Bortolami Dayan, New York, NY2005Uncertain States of America: American Art in the 3rd Millennium, Astrup Fearnley, Oslo, Norway; traveled to Bard College, New York, NY; Serpentine Gallery, London, UK; Reykjavik Art

Museum, Reykjavik, Iceland; Galerie Rudolfinum, Prague, Czech Republic (exh. cat.)

Art Rock, Rockefeller Plaza, New York, NY

Sutton Lane in Paris, Sutton Lane c/o Galerie Ghislaine Hussenot, Paris, France

Thing, UCLA Hammer Museum, Los Angeles, CA (exh. cat.)2004Magic Show, Hayworth Gallery, Los Angeles, CA

Mystery Achievement, Taxter & Spengemann, New York, NY

Slouching Towards Bethlehem, The Project, New York, NY

Drunk vs. Stoned, Gavin Brown’s Passerby, New York, NY

Nature Study: A Selection of Artists’ from New York and Los Angeles, California State University, Bakersfield, CA2003Another Sculpture Show, Angstrom Gallery, Dallas, TX

Buy Contortions, Taxter & Spengemann, New York, NY

Threedimetrical, Happy Lion, Los Angeles, CA

California Welcomes You, Scope, Los Angeles, CA Ordinary Uncanny, Scope, New York, NY

Grant Selwyn Fine Art, Beverly Hills, CA2002Four Times One Minus One, Hayworth Gallery, Los Angeles, CA

Fondazione Ratti, Como, Italy

Nanotechnology, The Whole Gallery, Baltimore, MD

Everything Everywhere, The H. Lewis Gallery, Baltimore, MD

 Bibliography 

 Catalogues 2013Mikkelsen, Egil, Magne Malmanger, and Margrethe Geelmuyden. Ekebergparken. Oslo: Orfeus, 2013.2012Engberg, Siri, ed. Lifelike. Minneapolis: Walker Art Center, 2012, 61, 170-71, 180.

Freeman, Jonah and Vera Neykov. Blind Cut. New York: Marlborough Gallery, 2012, 55.

Jacobson, Heidi Zuckerman, and James Frey. Funny. New York: Flag Art Foundation, 2012.

Spengemann, Pascal. Matt Johnson: Small Sculptures. Los Angeles: Wood Kusaka Studios, 2012.2011Cahill, James. Frank Benson, Mark Grotjahn, Matt Johnson. London: Sadie Coles, 2011.2010Gülicher, Nina. “Matt Johnson: Materielle Widersprüche.” In Larger Than Life: Stranger Than Fiction. Fellbach. Germany: Stadt Fellbach; Heule, Belgium: Snoeck, 2010, 128-129.

Johnson, Matt. Dice, The Meteorite (Duchamp), and The Electron. Los Angeles: Matt Johnson, 2010.2009Colburn, Tyler. “Matt Johnson.” In Vitamin 3-D: New Perspectives in Sculpture and Installation. London: Phaidon, 2009, 164-165.2007All About Laughter: Humor in Contemporary Art. Tokyo: Mori Art Museum, 2007.2006Steiner, Rochelle. The World is Round. New York: Public Art Fund, 2006.2005'''

Birnbaum, Daniel, Gunnar B. Kvaran, and Hans Ulrich Obrist, eds. Uncertain States of America: American Art in the 3rd Millennium. Oslo: Astrup Fearnley Museum of Modern Art, 2005.Thing: New Sculpture from Los Angeles''. Los Angeles: Armand Hammer Museum of Art, 2005, 42-45.

Museum and Public Collections 
Astrup Fearnley Museum of Art, Oslo, Norway

Ekebergparken Sculpture Park, Oslo, Norway

Hammer Museum, Los Angeles, CA

Pérez Art Museum Miami, Miami, FL

Whitney Museum of American Art, New York, NY

References

External links 
 Matt Johnson at the Frieze Art Fair
 Images, biography and texts from the Saatchi Gallery
 Further information from Initial Access

American contemporary artists
1978 births
Living people
University of California, Los Angeles alumni